Friend or Foe may refer to:

Film and television
Friend or Foe (film), a 1982 British film by John Krish
Friend or Foe (game show), a 2002–2003 American game show that aired on Game Show Network
Friend or Foe (SpongeBob SquarePants), animated TV series episode

Music
Friend or Foe (album), album by Adam Ant
"Friend or Foe" (Adam Ant song) (1982)
Friend or Foe? (The Forces of Evil album)
Friend or Foe? (Blackmail album) (2003)
"Friend or Foe" (t.A.T.u song)

Other uses
Identification friend or foe, cryptographic identification system
Spider-Man: Friend or Foe, computer and video game
 Friend or Foe, a former YouTube series on SB737’s, Tomohawk’s, iBallisticSquid’s and BigBSt4tz’s YouTube channels

See also
Friend and Foe, an album by Menomena